Henrietta Frances Phipps (née Lamb, 9 December 1931 – 27 May 2016) was a British landscape gardener. Phipps worked for the Royal Borough of Kensington and Chelsea for many years and "shaped the look of the royal borough".

Early life 
Phipps was born in Paddington, London on 9 December 1931, the eldest of three children of the artist Henry Lamb, and the writer, Lady Pansy Pakenham. She grew up in the village of Coombe Bissett, three miles southwest of Salisbury and was educated at Somerville College, Oxford.

Career 
Phipps' first employment after graduating from Oxford was for the writer Peter Quennell at History Today. She later took up landscape gardening and was a long-standing member of the Ladbroke Square Gardens Committee. She gave guided tours of the gardens, spoke at residents' meetings, and wrote articles on the communal gardens, including two published in the Ladbroke Association newsletter in 1994 and 1996.

Phipps worked for the Kensington and Chelsea Council and landscaped a number of their public areas.

Personal life 
Phipps married the silversmith, William Phipps, in 1960. He was the son of Sir Eric Phipps, the British ambassador to Germany from 1933 to 1937. She met her future husband when her father was painting a portrait of Eric Phipps.

The Phipps had three sons and a daughter.

References

1931 births
2016 deaths
British gardeners
People from Paddington
Alumni of Somerville College, Oxford